Antal Dunai,  also known as Dunai II (né Dujmov, 21 March 1943) is a Hungarian former footballer with Yugoslav origins. He became a first division player at Pécsi Dózsa, but he spent the majority of his career at Újpesti Dózsa from 1965 to 1977, when he moved to Debreceni VSC. He played 31 games and scored 9 goals for the Hungary national team. He is most famous for his participation in the gold medal winning Hungarian team on the 1968, and silver medal winning national team on the 1972 Olympics.

Career statistics

References

Sources
 MTI Ki Kicsoda 2006, Magyar Távirati Iroda, Budapest, 2005, p. 432.
 Ki kicsoda a magyar sportéletben?, I. kötet (A–H). Szekszárd, Babits Kiadó, 1994, p. 278., 
 Bio on nssz.hu
 MLSZ-felköszöntés Dunai Antal 65. születésnapja alkalmából 
 Profile on mob.hu p. 3.

1943 births
Association football forwards
Hungarian footballers
Újpest FC players
Debreceni VSC players
Debreceni VSC managers
Xerez CD managers
Real Betis managers
CD Castellón managers
Zalaegerszegi TE managers
Levante UD managers
Real Murcia managers
UEFA Euro 1972 players
Hungary international footballers
Olympic footballers of Hungary
Footballers at the 1964 Summer Olympics
Footballers at the 1968 Summer Olympics
Footballers at the 1972 Summer Olympics
Olympic gold medalists for Hungary
Olympic silver medalists for Hungary
Living people
Olympic medalists in football
Medalists at the 1972 Summer Olympics
Medalists at the 1968 Summer Olympics
Expatriate footballers in Spain
Hungarian expatriate sportspeople in Spain
Hungarian football managers
Sportspeople from Bács-Kiskun County
UEFA Champions League top scorers